Salford Township is a township in Montgomery County, Pennsylvania, United States. The population was 2,504 at the 2010 census.

History
Salford Township, founded in 1892, is a portion of the original Salford Township. In 1741, because of population growth the original Salford Township split into Marlborough, Upper Salford and Lower Salford townships, and part of Franconia Township. In 1892, Upper Salford further split into the present day Salford and Upper Salford townships. The earliest official documents for the original Salford Township are located within the four extant townships and at the state library.

The Landis Homestead was listed on the National Register of Historic Places in 1986.

Geography
According to the United States Census Bureau, the township has a total area of 9.6 square miles (24.7 km2), of which 9.5 square miles (24.7 km2)  is land and 0.04 square mile (0.1 km2)  (0.21%) is water. The township is drained by the Perkiomen Creek into the Schuylkill River. Its villages include Naceville (also in Bucks County) and Tylersport.

Neighboring municipalities
Franconia Township (southeast)
Upper Salford Township (southwest)
Marlborough Township (northwest)
West Rockhill Township, Bucks County (northeast)

Transportation

The Pennsylvania Turnpike Northeast Extension (I-476) is the most prominent highway passing through Salford Township. However, the nearest interchanges are down in Towamencin Township and up in Milford Township. The main road providing local access is Pennsylvania Route 563, which follows Ridge Road through the township on a northeast-southwest alignment.

Demographics
{{stack|
As of the 2010 census, the township was 96.8% White, 0.8% Black or African American, 0.2% Native American, 1.0% Asian, and 0.7% were two or more races. 1.3% of the population were of Hispanic or Latino ancestry.

At the 2000 census there were 2,363 people, 807 households, and 677 families living in the township.  The population density was 247.8 people per square mile (95.6/km2).  There were 821 housing units at an average density of 86.1/sq mi (33.2/km2).  The racial makeup of the township was 97.33% White, 0.68% African American, 0.08% Native American, 0.76% Asian, 0.17% from other races, and 0.97% from two or more races. Hispanic or Latino of any race were 1.10%.

There were 807 households, 36.4% had children under the age of 18 living with them, 74.6% were married couples living together, 5.5% had a female householder with no husband present, and 16.1% were non-families. 12.5% of households were made up of individuals, and 4.2% were one person aged 65 or older.  The average household size was 2.92 and the average family size was 3.19.

The age distribution was 25.8% under the age of 18, 7.2% from 18 to 24, 27.1% from 25 to 44, 29.4% from 45 to 64, and 10.5% 65 or older.  The median age was 40 years. For every 100 females there were 101.3 males.  For every 100 females age 18 and over, there were 103.1 males.

The median household income was $66,775 and the median family income  was $73,750. Males had a median income of $46,731 versus $28,250 for females. The per capita income for the township was $29,740.  About 0.9% of families and 2.6% of the population were below the poverty line, including 1.2% of those under age 18 and 4.1% of those age 65 or over.

Government and politics

References

External links

 Salford Township

Townships in Montgomery County, Pennsylvania